The giant hummingbird (Patagona gigas) is the only member of the genus Patagona and the largest member of the hummingbird family, weighing  and having a wingspan of approximately  and length of . This is approximately the same length as a European starling or a northern cardinal, though the giant hummingbird is considerably lighter because it has a slender build and long bill, making the body a smaller proportion of the total length. This weight is almost twice that of the next heaviest hummingbird species and ten times that of the smallest, the bee hummingbird.

Taxonomy 
The giant hummingbird was described and illustrated in 1824 by the French ornithologist Louis Jean Pierre Vieillot based on a specimen that Vieillot mistakenly believed had been collected in Brazil. The type locality was designated as Valparaíso in Chile by Carl Eduard Hellmayr in 1945. The giant hummingbird is now the only species placed in the genus Patagona that was introduced by George Robert Gray in 1840.

Molecular phylogenetic studies have shown that the giant hummingbird has no close relatives and is sister to the hummingbird subfamily Trochilinae, a large clade containing the tribes Lampornithini (mountain gems), Mellisugini (bees) and Trochilini (emeralds).

Two subspecies are recognised:
 P. g. peruviana Boucard, 1893 – southwest Colombia to north Chile and northwest Argentina
 P. g. gigas (Vieillot, 1824) – central, south Chile and west-central Argentina

These subspecies are thought to have emerged as a result of partial geographical separation of populations by volcanic activity in the Andes predating the Miocene; however, there remain areas of contact between the species, hence the lack of full speciation. The proposed phylogenetic system for hummingbirds suggested by McGuire et al. (2009) accommodates the possible elevation of these subspecies to species rank.

Description 

The giant hummingbird can be identified by its large size and characteristics such as the presence of an eye-ring, straight bill longer than the head, dull colouration, very long wings (approaching the tail tip when stowed), long and moderately forked tail, tarsi feathered to the toes and large, sturdy feet. There is no difference between the sexes. Juveniles have small corrugations on the lateral beak culmen.

The subspecies are visually distinguishable. P. g. peruviana is yellowish brown overall and has white on the chin and throat, where P. g. gigas is more olive green to brown and lacks white on the chin and throat.

The giant hummingbird occasionally glides in flight, a behavior very rare among hummingbirds. Its elongated wings allow more efficient glides than do those of other hummingbirds. The giant hummingbird's voice is a distinctive loud, sharp and whistling "chip".

Distribution and habitat 
The giant hummingbird is widely distributed throughout the length of the Andes on both the east and west sides. It typically inhabits the higher altitude scrubland and forests that line the slopes of the Andes during the summer and then retreats to similar, lower altitude habitats in winter months. The species persists through a large altitude range, with specimens retrieved from sea level up to 4600 m. They have shown to be fairly resilient to urbanisation and agricultural activities; however, the removal of vegetation limits their distribution in dense city areas and industrial zones. The giant hummingbird migrates in summer to the temperate areas of South America, reaching as low as 44° S. Correspondingly, it migrates north to more tropical climates in winter (March–August), though not usually venturing higher than 28° S.

P. g. peruviana occurs from Ecuador to the southeastern mountains of Peru and P. g. gigas from northern Bolivia and Chile to Argentina. Contact between subspecies is most likely to occur around the eastern slopes of the north Peruvian Andes.

Behaviour 
Hummingbirds are extremely agile and acrobatic flyers, regularly partaking in sustained hovering flight, often used not only to feed on the wing but to protect their territory and court mates. The giant hummingbird is typical in that it will brazenly defend its precious energy-rich flower territory from other species and other giant hummingbirds. These birds are typically seen alone, in pairs or small family groups.

Flight, anatomy and physiology 

The giant hummingbird hovers at an average of 15 wing beats per second, a slow rate for a hummingbird. Its resting heart rate is 300 beats per minute, with a peak rate in flight of 1020 beats per minute. Energy requirements for hummingbirds do not scale evenly with size increases, meaning a larger bird such as giant hummingbird requires more energy per gram to hover than a smaller bird.  

The giant hummingbird requires an estimated 4.3 calories of food energy per hour to sustain its flight.  This huge requirement along with the low oxygen availability and thin air (generating little lift) at the high altitudes where the giant hummingbird usually lives suggest that it is close to the viable maximum size for a hummingbird.

Food and feeding 

The giant hummingbird feeds mainly on nectar, visiting a range of flowers. The female giant hummingbird has been observed ingesting sources of calcium (sand, soil, slaked lime and wood ash) after the reproductive season to replenish the calcium used in egg production; the low calcium content of nectar necessitates these extra sources. Similarly, a nectar-based diet is low in protein and various dietary minerals, and this is countered by consuming insects.

It regularly feeds from the flowers of the genus Puya in Chile, with which it enjoys a symbiotic relationship, trading pollination for food. As a large hovering bird, particularly at high altitudes, the giant hummingbird has extremely high metabolic requirements. It is known to feed from columnar cacti, including Oreocereus celsianus and Echinopsis atacamensis ssp. pasacana, and Salvia haenkei.

Considering the energy-rich nature of nectar as a food source, it attracts a large range of visitors apart from the hummingbird, which has coevolved with a plant to be the flower's most efficient pollinator.  These other visitors, because they are not designed to access the well-hidden bounty of nectar, often damage the flowers (for example, piercing them at the base) and prevent further nectar production. Because of its high energy requirements, the giant hummingbird alters its foraging behaviour as a direct response to nectar robbing from other birds and animals, and this reduces the viability of the hummingbird in an area with many nectar robbers, as well as indirectly affecting the plants by reducing pollination. If alien species are introduced that become nectar thieves, it is reasonable to predict that their activities will significantly impact the local ecosystem. This could prove to be a future risk for the giant hummingbird populations because they sit close to the physical limit in their metabolic demands.

Breeding 
There is little known of the giant hummingbird's breeding behaviour, but some generalisations can be inferred from other hummingbird species. Hummingbird males tend to have polygynous, occasionally promiscuous, behaviours and no involvement after copulation. The female builds the nest and lays a clutch of two eggs during the summer. A giant hummingbird nest is small considering the size of the bird, typically made near water sources and perched on a branch of a tree or shrub parallel to the ground.

Cultural significance 
The giant hummingbird holds significant value for some of the aboriginal inhabitants of the Andes. The people of Chiloé Island believe that if a woman captures a hummingbird then they will gain great fertility from it.  This species is a likely inspiration to the people of the Nazca culture who created the Nazca hummingbird geoglyph.

Status
The range of the giant hummingbird is sizable, estimated at 1,200,000 km2, with total numbers of about 10,000 adults. The species is classified by the International Union for Conservation of Nature as being of Least Concern.

References

External links

Giant hummingbird videos on the Internet Bird Collection
BirdLife Species Factsheet
Photographs of this and other hummingbird species
Giant hummingbird photo gallery VIREO
Behaviour in the wild in Chile, showing flight and vocalisations
Chip note

giant hummingbird
Birds of the Andes
Birds of the Puna grassland
Birds of Chile
Hummingbird species of South America
giant hummingbird
giant hummingbird